William Ralph Schroeder is an American philosopher and Emeritus Professor of Philosophy at the University of Illinois at Urbana-Champaign. He is known for his expertise on continental philosophy and ethics.

He has authored several books about philosophy.

Books
 Sartre and His Predecessors (Routledge & Kegan Paul, 1984) 
 A Companion to Continental Philosophy (Blackwell, 1998), co-editor with Simon Critchley
 Continental Philosophy: A Critical Approach (Blackwell, 2005)

References

External links
 William R. Schroeder
  A review of "Schopenhauer", Routledge, 2005, 271 pp., $22.95 (pbk),  Reviewed by William R. Schroeder

21st-century American philosophers
20th-century American philosophers
Phenomenologists
Continental philosophers
Existentialists
Philosophy academics
Heidegger scholars
Hegel scholars
Living people
University of Michigan alumni
Eastern Michigan University faculty
Date of birth missing (living people)
University of Illinois Urbana-Champaign faculty
Sartre scholars
Place of birth missing (living people)
1947 births